Chil Gongan (also Romanized as Chīl Gongān; also known as Chīleh Gongon) is a village in Rudkhaneh Bar Rural District, Rudkhaneh District, Rudan County, Hormozgan Province, Iran. At the 2006 census, its population was 80, in 20 families.

References 

Populated places in Rudan County